Wie wordt euromiljonair? (English translation: Who will be a euromillionaire?) was a Belgian game show based on the original British format of Who Wants to Be a Millionaire?. The main goal of the game was to win €1 million by answering 15 multiple-choice questions correctly. Wie wordt euromiljonair? was broadcast from 2002 to 2006. The show was shown on the Belgian television station vtm. The first safe haven was on question 5 for €500, the second one on question 10 for €12,500.

2002 - 2006 payout structure

Old version 
From 1999 to 2001, it was called Wie wordt multimiljonair? (English translation: Who will be a multimillionaire?). Its host was also Walter Grootaers. The biggest prize was 20 million Belgian francs.

1999 - 2001 payout structure

References

Who Wants to Be a Millionaire?
1999 Belgian television series debuts
2001 Belgian television series endings
2002 Belgian television series debuts
2006 Belgian television series endings
1990s Belgian television series
2000s Belgian television series
1990s Belgian game shows
2000s Belgian game shows
VTM (TV channel) original programming